Canal Futura (Futura Channel), also known as Futura, is a Brazilian paid educational television channel. It belongs to the Canais Globo group of channels, a subsidiary of Globo, and was founded on December 11, 1999. The channel of the station is captured on cable TV operators, and satellite dishes.

History 
The station was established in 1999 as a project of the Fundação Roberto Marinho (Roberto Marinho Foundation). It has since become a reference as a project of education and relevant experience of social investment. The Canal Futura was created to bring the entire Brazilian population, especially the lower classes, knowledge that can be applied to everyday life, generating and proposing changes to a better integration in the labor market, family life, school and social.The station is financially supported by the following partners maintainers: National Confederation of Industry of Brazil (CNI), Federation of Industries of the State of São Paulo (FIESP), Federation of Industries of the State of Rio de Janeiro (FIRJAN), Bradesco Foundation, Itaú Social Foundation, Vale Foundation, Rede Globo, Brazilian Service to Support Micro and Small Enterprises (SEBRAE), CNN and Votorantim Group.

Target Audience 
Futura is mainly aimed at classes C and D, and is aimed at young people, workers, housewives and educators. Its goal is that all the productions exhibited can be seen and used by the widest range of people, the city and the countryside.

By 2015 the channel was also heavily focused on children, broadcasting cartoons similar to TV Cultura, but they were removed in favor of Gloob.

References

External links 
 

Mass media in Rio de Janeiro (city)
Television channels and stations established in 1999
Globosat
Grupo Globo subsidiaries
Portuguese-language television stations in Brazil
1999 establishments in Brazil